The following is a list of cartoon characters produced by Walter Lantz Productions:

Andy Panda (1939, anthropomorphic panda)
 Charlie Chicken (1942, anthropomorphic chicken)
 Milo (1945, anthropomorphic dog)
 Miranda Panda (1949, anthropomorphic panda, girlfriend of Andy)
 Mr. Whippletree (1939, anthropomorphic turtle)
 Poppa Panda (1939, anthropomorphic panda)
 Baby-Face Mouse (1938, anthropomorphic mouse)
 The Beary Family (1962, anthropomorphic bears)
 Charlie Beary (Papa)
 Bessie Beary (Mama)
 Junior Beary (son)
 Suzy Beary (daughter)
 Goose (pet goose)
 Chilly Willy (1953, anthropomorphic penguin)
 Chilly Lilly (2000, anthropomorphic penguin, girlfriend of Willy)
 Gooney the "Gooney Bird" Albatross (1969, anthropomorphic albatross)
 Maxie the Polar Bear (1966, anthropomorphic polar bear)
 Smedley (1954, anthropomorphic dog)
 Doxie Dachshund (1937, anthropomorphic dog)
 Doc (1959, anthropomorphic cat)
 Cecil (1959, anthropomorphic dog)
 Champ (1960, anthropomorphic dog)
 Hickory & Dickory (see entry below)
 Elmer the Great Dane (1935, anthropomorphic dog)
 Cuddles the Great Dane (1954, anthropomorphic dog)
 Mr. Percy P. Pettipoint (1954, human)
 Fatso the Bear (1960, anthropomorphic bear)
 Hickory & Dickory (1959, anthropomorphic mice)
 Cecil (see entry above)
 Doc (see entry above)
Homer Pigeon (1942, anthropomorphic pigeon)
 Inspector Willoughby a.k.a. Secret Agent 6 & 7/8 (1958, human)
Li'l Eightball (1939, human)
 Maggie and Sam (1955, humans)
 Maw and Paw (1953, humans)
 more than a dozen of their kids
 Milford (anthropomorphic pet pig)
 Meany, Miny, and Moe (1935, anthropomorphic monkeys)
 Oswald the Lucky Rabbit (1929, anthropomorphic rabbit; originally a Disney character)
 Pepito Chickeeto (1957, anthropomorphic chicken)
 Peterkin (1939, mythological faun)
 Kitty (1930, anthropomorphic cat; originally a Disney character, now known as Ortensia the Cat)
 Pooch the Pup (1932, anthropomorphic dog)
 Sam & Simian ("Jungle Medics" 1960, anthropomorphic monkeys)
 Space Mouse (1960, anthropomorphic mouse)
 Windy & Breezy (1957, anthropomorphic bears)
 Woody Woodpecker (1940, anthropomorphic woodpecker)
 Buzz Buzzard (1948, anthropomorphic buzzard)
 Dapper Denver Dooley (1955, human)
 Duffy Dog (1963, anthropomorphic dog)
 Gabby Gator (1960, anthropomorphic alligator)
 Ms. Meany (1963, human)
 Professor Dingledong (1955, human)
 Professor Großenfibber (1965, human)
 Splinter & Knothead (1956, anthropomorphic woodpeckers, niece and nephew of Woody)
 Wally Walrus (1944, anthropomorphic walrus)
 Winnie Woodpecker (1954, anthropomorphic woodpecker, girlfriend of Woody)
 Sugarfoot (1954, anthropomorphic horse)

See also
Walter Lantz Productions
Golden Age of American animation

References

External links 
 The Walter Lantz-o-Pedia
 Woody Woodpecker and Friends DVD collection
 Walter Lantz Productions cartoons @ BCDB.com

Fictional anthropomorphic characters
Universal Pictures cartoons and characters
1950s American animated television series
1960s American animated television series
1970s American animated television series
1980s American animated television series
1990s American animated television series
Lists of fictional characters